Wolf to Man is the eighth full-length studio album by the Greek/Swedish melodic death metal band, Nightrage. It was released by Despotz  on 29 March 2019.

The album was recorded at Otse music studio Thessaloniki, Greece by Nik Logiotatidis and at Bombshelter studios Uppsala, Sweden. It was mixed and mastered by Ronnie Björnström at The Mixroom (Enhanced Audio Productions) Umeå, Sweden.

Wolf to man was also released in Japan by record label Avalon/Marquee. The Bonus Track for Japanese release is a cover of "Song From a Secret Garden" by Secret Garden.

Cover art/layout is made by Vagelis Petiklas of Revolver Design.

Track listing

Credits

Band members
Ronnie Nyman − vocals
Marios Iliopoulos − guitars
Magnus Söderman − guitars
Francisco Escalona - bass
Dino George Stamoglou − drums

Guest musicians
Joakim Honkanen - additional background vocals
Additional drums played by Lawrence Dinamarca

References

External links
 

Nightrage albums
2019 albums